Stephanie Au Hoi-shun (born 30 May 1992) is a Hong Kong competitive swimmer. She is a four-time Olympian, having represented Hong Kong at the 2008, 2012, 2016 and 2020 Summer Olympics. She also represented Hong Kong in four editions of FINA World Aquatics Championships (2013, 2015, 2019, 2022) and FINA World Swimming Championships (25 m) (2008, 2014 2018, 2021) respectively.

Au is the holder of 18 Hong Kong national records, plus former record holder in 8 other events. Currently she holds long course records in the 800 m freestyle, 50m, 100m backstroke, short course records in 800 m and 1500 m freestyle, 50m, 100, 200m backstroke, together with all long course and short course women's relay records (4×100 m medley, 4×100 m freestyle and 4×200 m freestyle relay). 

She studied at Sacred Heart Canossian College., and swam for the University of California, Berkeley, from which she graduated with a degree in environmental economics and policy in 2014. She is also a winner of the 24th Hong Kong Outstanding Students Awards.

She represented Hong Kong at the 2020 Summer Olympics held in Tokyo, Japan.

References 

1992 births
Living people
Hong Kong female backstroke swimmers
Hong Kong female freestyle swimmers
Olympic swimmers of Hong Kong
Swimmers at the 2008 Summer Olympics
Swimmers at the 2012 Summer Olympics
Swimmers at the 2016 Summer Olympics
Swimmers at the 2010 Asian Games
Swimmers at the 2014 Asian Games
Swimmers at the 2018 Asian Games
Asian Games silver medalists for Hong Kong
Asian Games bronze medalists for Hong Kong
Asian Games medalists in swimming
Medalists at the 2010 Asian Games
Medalists at the 2014 Asian Games
Medalists at the 2018 Asian Games
Universiade medalists in swimming
Universiade medalists for Hong Kong
Medalists at the 2015 Summer Universiade
Swimmers at the 2020 Summer Olympics
California Golden Bears women's swimmers
21st-century Hong Kong women